Madia sativa, known by the common names coast tarweed and Chilean tarweed, is a species of flowering plant in the family Asteraceae found in parts of western North and South America.

Distribution
Madia sativa is native to the Americas, where it is distributed in two main areas: 
The west coast of North America from Alaska and British Columbia, through all the western mountain ranges of California, to Baja California.
South America in Chile and Argentina.

The plant grows in many types of habitats, including disturbed areas. In western North America it is most common on coastal grasslands and nearby areas.

Description
Madia sativa is an annual herb varying in size from 20 centimeters tall to well over two meters, the leafy stem branching or not. It is coated densely in sticky resin glands and it has a strong scent. The hairy leaves are linear or lance-shaped, the lowest up to 18 centimeters long.

The inflorescence is generally a cluster of flower heads lined with bristly, glandular phyllaries. Each head bears approximately 8 yellowish ray florets a few millimeters long around a center of several disc florets tipped with dark anthers.

The fruit is a flat, hairless achene with no pappus. This plant has been grown for its seed oil.

References

External links
Calflora Database: Madia sativa (Coastal Tarweed)
Jepson Manual eFlora (TJM2) treatment of Madia sativa
UC Photos gallery — Madia sativa

sativa
Flora of Alaska
Flora of British Columbia
Flora of the West Coast of the United States
Flora of Baja California
Flora of California
Flora of Chile
Flora of Argentina
Chilean Matorral
Natural history of the California chaparral and woodlands
Natural history of the California Coast Ranges
Flora without expected TNC conservation status